Juan Bautista Baigorria, also known as Granadero Baigorria, was born in San Luis Province and died at the Battle of San Lorenzo on 3 February 1813, was an Argentine soldier. He died in battle and became famous by having saved his commander when he stopped a royalist from bayonnetting then-colonel José de San Martín.

Military career 
Baigorria was part of the 1st company of Regiment of Mounted Grenadiers. He was at the Battle of San Lorenzo, on 3 February 1813. When a royalist soldier tried to kill his commanding officer, then-colonel San Martín who had a leg pinned under his fallen horse, Baigorria killed the enemy with his lance. San Martín's horse had been wounded and felled by a royalist who shot the animal, which then caught the colonel on his leg. This action by Baigorria allowed Private Juan Bautista Cabral to help the colonel and save his life. Baigorria died in this action after being wounded by a royalist.

He is remembered and honored with the town of Granadero Baigorria in Santa Fe Province, named after him.

References 

Year of birth uncertain
1813 deaths
People from San Luis Province
Argentine people of Basque descent
Argentine Army personnel
Argentine military personnel killed in the Argentine War of Independence